The State Routes in the U.S. state of Georgia (typically abbreviated SR) are maintained by the Georgia Department of Transportation (GDOT). Routes from 400 to 499 are mostly unsigned internal designations for Interstate Highways. Some of the Governor's Road Improvement Program (GRIP) corridors are numbered from 500 to 599.

Mainline highways

Special routes

See also

References

External links
 Georgia Roads - The Unofficial Georgia State Highways Web Site
 Georgia State Highway Ends

 
State highways